Nõiduse õpilane is a novel by Estonian author Karl Ristikivi. It was first published in 1967 in Lund, Sweden by Eesti Kirjanike Kooperatiiv (Estonian Writers' Cooperative). In Estonia it was published in 1994.

1967 Swedish novels
Novels by Karl Ristikivi